The 1896–97 Sheffield Shield season was the fifth season of the Sheffield Shield, the domestic first-class cricket competition of Australia. New South Wales won the championship.

Table

Statistics

Most Runs
Jack Lyons 404

Most Wickets
Tom McKibbin 44

References

Sheffield Shield
Sheffield Shield
Sheffield Shield seasons